Gurugram Airstrip (formerly Gurgaon Airstrip), also Bhondsi Airstrip and Silokhera  Airstrip, is an airstrip located between Silokhera and Bhondsi villages,  south of Gurugram city center, in Haryana state of India.

History

In 1948, first airstrip was built in Haryana when Ambala Air Force Station was established. During 1980s, the airstrip, hangar, air conditioned yoga ashram and TV studio were built by former Prime Minister Indira Gandhi's favorite godman and yoga guru Dhirendra Brahmachari who died in 1994 in a plane crash. Indira use to visit Brahmachari here once a week. The 1980s teleserials "India Quiz" and Hum Log (ran from July 1984 to  17 December 1985) were shot here. Brahmachari charged INR25,000 per shift for the use of ashram's TV studio facilities here for the shooting of Hum Log. In 1983, Brahmachari had written letter to then Chief Minister of Haryana, Bhajan Lal, with a request to acquire 5,000 acre land around Aravalli Range, potentially up to 70,000 acres in total, to build facilities to rival Disneyland, including a yoga research and training centre, a wildlife sanctuary, folk arts and crafts centre, amusement centre and other facilities such as helipad, aquarium, planetarium and games and thrillers. The aircraft hangar still has two ruined aircraft belonging to Brahmachari, likely including a Maule M-5 American aircraft owned by him that landed him in investigations for tax evasions.

This airstrip lies near the "Bharat Yatra Kendra" "Bhondsi ashram" set up by the former Prime Minister Chandra Shekhar in 1983 on 600 acre of panchayat land, where another godman Chandraswami and godman's associate Adnan Khashoggi (a Saudi Arabian billionaire international arms dealer embroiled in various scandals) use to visit him. Before 2002, some of the government land of the ashram was taken back by the Government of Haryana on the instructions of then Chief Minister Om Prakash Chautala (in office 1989-91 and 1999–2004). In 2002, Supreme Court of India returned most of the land, barring some land, to the Bhondsi gram panchayat.

Facilities
It has a kilometre-long runway and an aircraft hangar large enough for 3 aircraft.

Current status
This airstrip is included in the Airport Authority of India's UDAN-RCS regional connectivity scheme to inaugurate new flight routes from the unserved airports in India.

See also 

 List of airports in India by state
 Airports Authority of India
 List of busiest airports in India
 List of Indian Air Force bases
 Divisions of Haryana
 List of highways in Haryana
 Railway in Haryana

References

Gurgaon district
Airports in Haryana
Airports established in the 1980s
1980s establishments in Haryana
20th-century architecture in India